The Trzcianka coal mine is a large mine in the north-west of Poland in Trzcianka, Greater Poland Voivodeship, 127 km north-west of the capital, Warsaw. Trzcianka represents one of the largest coal reserve in Poland having estimated reserves of 142 million tonnes of coal. The annual coal production is around 3 million tonnes.

References

External links 
 Official site

Coal mines in Poland
Coal mines in Greater Poland Voivodeship